Spiritus Domini is a Latin expression which literally translates to "the Spirit of the Lord". It can refer to:

 a Latin name of the Holy Spirit in Christianity
 the introit to the Pentecost Mass in the Catholic Church
 the magazine of the Vocationist Fathers
 a 1 August 1987 ecclesiastical letter of John Paul II about Alphonsus Liguori
 Spiritus Domini, a 10 January 2021 motu proprio of Pope Francis allowing women to join the instituted ministries of acolyte and lector